Daniel Nathans (October 30, 1928 – November 16, 1999) was an American microbiologist. He shared the 1978 Nobel Prize in Physiology or Medicine for the discovery of restriction enzymes and their application in restriction mapping.

Early life and education

Nathans was born in Wilmington, Delaware, the last of nine children born to Russian Jewish immigrant parents, Sarah (Levitan) and Samuel Nathans. During the Great Depression his father lost his small business and was unemployed for a long time.

Nathans attended public schools and then to the University of Delaware, where he received his BS degree in chemistry in 1950. He received his MD degree from Washington University in St. Louis in 1954 and did a one-year internship at  Presbyterian Medical Center with Robert Loeb.

Wanting a break before his medical residency, Nathans became a clinical associate at the National Cancer Institute at the National Institutes of Health in Bethesda, Maryland. There he split his time between caring for patients receiving experimental cancer chemotherapy and research on recently discovered plasma-cell tumors in mice, similar to human multiple myeloma. Struck by how little was known about cancer biology, he became interested in protein synthesis in myeloma tumors, and published his first papers on this research.

Nathans returned to Columbia Presbyterian Medical Center for a two-year residency in 1957, again on Robert Loeb's service. He continued working on the problem of protein synthesis as time allowed. In 1959, he decided to work on the research full time and became a research associate at Fritz Lipmann's lab at the Rockefeller Institute in New York.

Career

In 1962, Nathans came to Johns Hopkins School of Medicine as an assistant professor of microbiology. He was promoted to associate professor in 1965 and to professor in 1967. He became the director of the microbiology department in 1972 and served in that position until 1982. In 1981, the department of microbiology was renamed the department of molecular biology and genetics.

In 1982 Johns Hopkins University made Nathans a University Professor, a position in which he served until his death in 1999. He also became a senior investigator of the Howard Hughes Medical Institute unit at Johns Hopkins School of Medicine in 1982.

From 1995 to 1996, Nathans served as the interim president of Johns Hopkins University.

In January 1999, Johns Hopkins School of Medicine established the McKusick-Nathans Institute of Genetic Medicine, a multidisciplinary clinical and research center named for Nathans and pioneering medical geneticist Victor McKusick.

Nathans was also given six honorary doctorates over the span of his career.

Awards

 1967: Selman Waksman Award in Microbiology
 1976: NAS Award in Molecular Biology
 1977: Elected to the American Academy of Arts and Sciences
 1978: Nobel Prize in Physiology or Medicine
 1979: Elected to the National Academy of Sciences
 1985: Elected to the American Philosophical Society
 1993: National Medal of Science

See also
 List of Jewish Nobel laureates

References

Further reading

External links

The Daniel Nathans Papers - Profiles in Science, National Library of Medicine
 

1928 births
1999 deaths
Nobel laureates in Physiology or Medicine
American Nobel laureates
Nobel laureates affiliated with Missouri
American microbiologists
Jewish microbiologists
Jewish American scientists
Johns Hopkins University faculty
National Medal of Science laureates
Columbia University people
People from Wilmington, Delaware
Presidents of Johns Hopkins University
Washington University School of Medicine alumni
American people of Russian-Jewish descent
University of Delaware alumni
Howard Hughes Medical Investigators
Members of the United States National Academy of Sciences
Members of the American Philosophical Society
Washington University in St. Louis alumni
Cornell University people